Styan's bulbul (Pycnonotus taivanus) is an endemic species of bulbul found in eastern and southern Taiwan. Though common in some areas, it has been listed as a species vulnerable to extinction. Its decline has been caused by habitat destruction and hybridisation with the closely related Chinese or light-vented bulbul. The two species' ranges overlap in several areas, partly because birds of the latter species have been released for Buddhist ceremonies. The species has already become extinct in Yilan County (Taiwan).

Taxonomy and systematics
Alternate names for Styan's bulbul include the Formosan black-headed bulbul and Taiwan black-headed bulbul (: meaning “black head bird”). The latter name is also used to refer to a subspecies of the light-vented bulbul.

Description

Styan's bulbul has a very similar appearance to the light-vented bulbul, but they differ in the patterns on the head. Styan's bulbul has a completely black crown with white feathers around its eye, except for a black moustachial stripe below the beak. Hybrids are intermediate between the two species, with the moustachial stripe and white feathers around the eye, but the white feathers extend behind the crown.

References

External links
Birdlife factsheet

Styan's bulbul
Endemic birds of Taiwan
Styan's bulbul
Styan's bulbul